Euxoa lidia is a moth of the family Noctuidae. It is found in the coastal areas of northern Europe.

Some authors believe it to be a synonym of Euxoa adumbrata.

The wingspan is 31–37 mm. Adults are on wing from July to August.

The larvae feed on Taraxacum and Polygonum species.

External links
www.nic.funet.fi
 www.schmetterlinge-deutschlands.de
Fauna Europaea

Euxoa
Moths of Europe
Moths of Asia